Armando Ríos Piter (born 21 February 1973) is a Mexican politician who served as a senator in the LXIII and LXIV Legislatures of the Mexican Congress representing Guerrero as a legislator from the Party of the Democratic Revolution; while a senator, he became an independent and briefly pursued an independent presidential campaign. He also served as a federal deputy during the LXI Legislature.

Life
Ríos Piter was born in Tecpan de Galeana, Guerrero, but obtained his education in Mexico City, concurrently obtaining an economics degree from the Instituto Tecnológico Autónomo de México and a law degree from the Universidad Nacional Autónoma de México. His first public job was in the INFONAVIT, and a year later, he moved over to the SHCP.

Political career
In 2000, Ríos Piter entered state government for the first time when he became the deputy secretary for political matters in the government of the state of Guerrero, though he would soon leave the post in order to work toward a master's degree in national security awarded by Georgetown University. In 2003, he returned to Guerrero and became the deputy secretary of agricultural policy in the federal government at the Secretariat of Agrarian Reform (SRA). Two years later, upon the election of a new governor in Guerrero, he returned to Chilpancingo to serve as the state secretary of rural development. Additionally, he joined the Party of the Democratic Revolution (PRD) in 2007.

Legislative history
In 2009, Ríos Piter was elected to the Chamber of Deputies for the LXI Legislature; his district was the only win for the PRD in Guerrero that year. He was one of the PRD's leaders in the chamber that legislature, being the head of the PRD caucus in the Chamber of Deputies and also presiding over the Political Coordination Board and the Finance and Public Credit Commission. His commission assignments reflected his educational and government background, ranging from Ranching to Budget Analysis.

With his three-year term up, the PRD successfully ran Ríos Piter for the Senate, for a six-year term to cover the LXII and LXIII Legislatures in 2012. He sat on six regular committees, being secretary on four of them, in the LXII Legislature, and in the LXIII Legislature, he presided over the Population and Development Commission while sitting on others related to public finances, corruption, and radio, television and film, among others. During his tenure, he mounted a bid to be the PRD gubernatorial candidate in 2015 in Guerrero, but he declined over his outrage that Jesús Ortega Martínez, part of another faction of the PRD known as "Los Chuchos", obligated him to sign a political pact with disgraced governor Ángel Aguirre Rivero to be the candidate. The Senate also named Ríos Piter as one of its designees to the Constituent Assembly of Mexico City, but his nomination failed to receive enough votes in the Senate.

In September 2016, Ríos Piter proposed legislation that would protect Mexicans should Donald Trump, as US president, inflict punishment on the country in order to fund the proposed border wall. He stressed that the economic welfare of the United States and Mexico was at stake. "At a time like this, it's vital for us to understand why this relationship benefits both. We're neighbors, we're friends, we're partners," he said. "He's putting (that) at risk."

Departure from the PRD and independent presidential candidacy
On 14 February 2017, Ríos Piter announced he would leave the PRD in order to start a nonpartisan movement called the Movimiento Jaguar (Jaguar Movement). His departure brought to eight the number of defections from the PRD among the senators it had elected in 2012. In leaving the PRD, he declared his resignation not just from the party but from "an entire system that now only produces noise and confrontation".

Three months later, he announced his intention to run for president in 2018 as an independent candidate. By early February 2018, he had reached the signature requirement—one percent of the electoral rolls in at least 17 of Mexico's 32 states—to appear on the 2018 presidential ballot as an independent, becoming the second candidate to do so behind Jaime Rodríguez Calderón. However, Ríos Piter did not reach the required number of signatures to appear on the ballot.

Ríos Piter also made calls to clear the political field, including Calderón and Margarita Zavala, and join forces to create a unified independent presidential campaign. According to Ríos Piter, the goal of such a combined candidacy would be to create a common platform "to confront the political parties and their candidates, who must be sent to rehabilitation".

References

1973 births
Living people
Politicians from Guerrero
Members of the Senate of the Republic (Mexico)
Members of the Chamber of Deputies (Mexico)
Mexican people of Russian descent
Party of the Democratic Revolution politicians
21st-century Mexican politicians
Members of the Constituent Assembly of Mexico City
Instituto Tecnológico Autónomo de México alumni
National Autonomous University of Mexico alumni
Georgetown University alumni
Senators of the LXII and LXIII Legislatures of Mexico